2010 Emmy Awards may refer to:

 62nd Primetime Emmy Awards, the 2010 Emmy Awards ceremony honoring primetime programming during June 2009 – May 2010
 37th Daytime Emmy Awards, the 2010 Emmy Awards ceremony honoring daytime programming during 2009
 31st Sports Emmy Awards, the 2010 Emmy Awards ceremony that honored sports programming during 2009
 38th International Emmy Awards, honoring international programming

Emmy Award ceremonies by year